Anthea Rosemary Gamble Carew (1906–1960) was, together with her brother Patrick, part of the Bright Young Things of the 1920s.

Biography
Anthea Rosemary Gamble was born in 1906, the daughter of Henry Gamble, Anglican priest and author, Dean of Exeter in the Church of England from 1918 to 1931, and Helen Maud Isherwood. Her brother was Patrick Gamble.

In 1928, Gamble married the Times sports journalist Dudley Carew. The marriage lasted only few months. In the early 1930s Anthea Gamble  was one of Brenda Dean Paul's closest friends. Like Paul, Carew was also a morphine addict. She was prosecuted twice 
in 1932, both cases involving Paul.

In the late 1930s, Carew moved to Yorkshire.

References

1906 births
1960 deaths
English socialites